Valentina Ballod (born 1 July 1937) is a Uzbekistani athlete. She competed in the women's high jump at the 1956 Summer Olympics and the 1960 Summer Olympics, representing the Soviet Union.

References

1937 births
Living people
Athletes (track and field) at the 1956 Summer Olympics
Athletes (track and field) at the 1960 Summer Olympics
Soviet female high jumpers
Uzbekistani female high jumpers
Olympic athletes of the Soviet Union
People from Samarkand
Universiade silver medalists for the Soviet Union
Universiade medalists in athletics (track and field)
Medalists at the 1959 Summer Universiade